The spot-breasted heleia (Heleia muelleri), also known as the spot-breasted white-eye, is a species of bird in the family Zosteropidae. It is found on Timor island. Its natural habitats are subtropical or tropical moist lowland forest and subtropical or tropical moist montane forest. It is threatened by habitat loss.

References

spot-breasted heleia
Birds of Timor
spot-breasted heleia
Taxonomy articles created by Polbot